Franceway Ranna Cossitt (April 24, 1790 – February 3, 1863) was an early Cumberland Presbyterian Minister and the first stated clerk of the Cumberland Presbyterian General Assembly in 1829. He was also the founder of Cumberland College in Princeton, Kentucky, in 1825, which was eventually moved to Lebanon, Tennessee, in 1843, to become Cumberland University. The name Franceway Ranna was a frontier corruption of François-René.

Early life

Education 

He was born at Claremont, New Hampshire on April 24, 1790. His family were Episcopalians. His maternal grandfather and an uncle were in succession pastors of the Episcopalian congregation at Claremont. His great uncle, Rev. Ranna Cossitt, was a Loyalist who became the first Anglican minister in Sydney, Nova Scotia.

At the age of fourteen, Mr. Cossitt commenced his preparation for college, and entered Middlebury College, in Vermont. In 1813 he graduated. His standing was high in a large class. After leaving college, he spent two years in teaching, at Morristown, New Jersey. It was customary, in those days, for men, after having completed their collegiate studies, to spend some time in teaching before entering upon the study of those things relating more immediately to their chosen profession. From Morristown, he went to North Carolina, and took charge of Vine Hill Academy, on Roanoke River.

From North Carolina, he returned to New England deeply impressed with the necessity of personal religion. Mr. Cossitt's original purpose was to engage in the legal profession, but with his spiritual change came a change of purpose. He resolved to devote himself to the Christian ministry. He studied theology at New Haven, in what has since become the General Episcopal Seminary of New York—the institution having been removed. Bishop Brownell, of Connecticut, gave him a license as a "lay reader" in the Episcopal Church.

Teaching and ministry
He then directed his course to Tennessee and established a school at a little place on Cumberland River, called in its day New York, a few miles below Clarksville. A number of his Carolina friends had moved and settled there. They were wealthy and desired to educate their children. With a view to this object, they urged his settlement among them. In addition, the opening and improving condition of the country presented a fine prospect to men engaged in the work of education. His school became in process of time, amongst other things, a sort of theological seminary. A number of young men preparing for the ministry resorted thither for the purpose of receiving instruction.

In the fall of 1821, he came to a camp meeting held on Wells's Creek, in Stewart county. He was accompanied to the meeting by William Clements, an educated gentleman and an elder in the Church, who had previously become acquainted with him. An introduction by such a man as Mr. Clements was a recommendation. They arrived at the meeting on Saturday. The ministers in attendance included Thomas Calhoun, Robert Baker, and Robert S. Donnell. Mr. Cossitt preached on Saturday evening, although still an Episcopalian. His text was, "If they hear not Moses and the prophets, neither will they be persuaded, though one rose from the dead." The sermon was an argument in support of the truth of the Christian Scriptures. This was his introduction to Cumberland Presbyterians. Mr. Calhoon was the manager of the meeting and treated him with great attention and respect.

In 1822 he was set apart in the whole work of the ministry in the Cumberland Presbyterian Church and became a member of the Anderson Presbytery. On the 19th of February, of the same year, he was married to Miss Lucinda Blair, of Montgomery County. Her father was a prominent member of the Church. Mr. Cossitt was now fairly identified with the Cumberland Presbyterians.

Shortly after his marriage, he issued a prospectus with a view to the publication of a paper, which he proposed to call the Western Star. For some reason, the publication was never commenced. After spending two or three years in New York, he moved to Elkton, Kentucky, and established a school there. His associations at Elkton were unusually pleasant. He always spoke of them with interest.

Cumberland College

Establishment 

At the sessions of the Cumberland Synod at Princeton, in 1825, the plan of Cumberland College was projected, and commissioners were appointed to examine particular points and make the location. Another set of commissioners was appointed to procure a charter for the proposed Institution from the Legislature of Kentucky. It was to have been called the Cumberland Presbyterian College. The gentlemen who visited the Legislature for the purpose of procuring a charter were advised to drop the "Presbyterian" from the proposed name, as it might arouse sectarian opposition among the members and their friends, and thus cause the application to be rejected. Accordingly, the application was made for a charter of Cumberland College. The change was displeasing to some leading members of the Church and was perhaps the first step in producing a series of embarrassments which in process of time became very numerous and great—so much that in a few years the existence of the Institution was placed in jeopardy.

Princeton and Elkton were rivals in their efforts for the location. The Institution was located in the vicinity of Princeton; a farm was bought about a mile from the town. It was to be a manual labor school, and arrangements were made accordingly. Mr. Cossitt was chosen President and opened the College for the reception of students in March 1826.

Cumberland College was an experiment. The country was comparatively new. The Cumberland Presbyterian Church had been chiefly devoted to the more immediate work of saving sinners and collecting congregations. The itinerant plan of preaching, and yearly camp meetings, constituted a large part of their machinery. The establishment of denominational schools and of colleges had been overlooked. The lessons necessary to conducting such enterprises with success had to be learned from experience. A practical man would have expected blunders and a probable failure. Again, the plan of the Institution was a novelty. It was a generous conception. Almost any reasoner would have decided that it was suitable to the wants and genius of plain, practical people. It looked to the education of young men, and especially of young men preparing for the ministry, who had not the means of supporting themselves at more expensive institutions of learning. Rugged young men, who had been first trained at the plow, and who had the vigor of body, were to be converted into scholars, statesmen, and pulpit orators. The students were to occupy dormitories provided for them, to use straw beds, and furniture of the plainest and cheapest king, and to board at a common boarding-house. The fare was to be healthful, but plain and cheap. All luxuries were proscribed. The students were to work two hours each day except the Sabbath and to pay sixty dollars a year into the College treasury.

Upon the opening of the College, Mr. Cossitt collected around him some of the best young men in the land. A large log building was constructed for College purposes, and the students who were educated there during ten of the first years of the Institution "rubbed their backs against wooden walls." Notwithstanding what would now be considered the grimness and severity of the system, the number of students was large. In the spring and summer of 1830, it reached one hundred and twenty-five.

Financial difficulties
At the meeting of the General Assembly in 1830, it was thought necessary to raise the charges in money from sixty to eighty dollars. Experience had shown that the expenditures of the establishment were greater than its friends had anticipated. The circumstance operated unfavorably, of course, upon the patronage of the Institution; still, its patronage was respectable. Pecuniary difficulties, however, rather increased than diminished. Money had been borrowed to pay for the farm, and other debts had been contracted, and the interest was an eating cancer.

In 1831 the General Assembly leased the College to Rev. John Barnett and Rev. Aaron Shelby for a term of years. The pecuniary difficulties of the Institution had become very great. The Church had become to some degree alienated; confidence in the final success of the enterprise was failing. Messrs. Barnett and Shelby were to have all the proceeds of the College after paying the necessary expenditures—to support a sufficient number of instructors, to keep up the boarding-house, and pay the debts of the College. They were considered men of great energy and perseverance, respectable financial ability, and devoted friends of the Church. Mr. Shelby continued his connection with the Institution till the summer or fall of 1833 when he sold his interest to Mr. Harvey Young. In the summer of 1834, Mr. Young died, and the entire management of the financial affairs of the College fell into the hands of Mr. Barnett. In the summer of 1834 cholera visited the town. A number of persons fell victim to the terrible disease. The College, however, did not disband. But the cholera was followed by a malignant fever, which extended to the College community, and spread over the country. The condition of things became so bad at the College, that a temporary suspension of operations was found absolutely necessary. The manager of the farm and boarding-house died; one of the professors was finally prostrated, one of the students died, and a number, in addition, was sick. It was a terrible blow to the Institution. It rallied, however, and the fall session commenced with favorable prospects. Still, there were financial troubles. The Church, too, began to complain about Mr. Barnett. Some thought he managed badly; others thought he managed wholly with a view to his own selfish ends; others went so far as to impeach his integrity as a man of business and a Christian. A change became necessary.

Accordingly, at the General Assembly in 1837, which met at Princeton, Cumberland College Association was formed. Mr. Barnett's interest was transferred to the Association. It was a joint-stock company. It was pledged to carry on the operations of the Institution under the direction and control of the General Assembly. A number of the most respectable and wealthy citizens of Princeton and the neighborhood entered the Association. Prospects seemed to brighten, and hope was restored once more. The Association entered upon their with vigor and energy. Still, after a temporary revival of interest and confidence, another cloud arose. An impression was made upon the minds of those in the neighborhood of the College that the Church had deserted it, and that neither contributions nor patronage was to be expected from that quarter. It was believed that busy persons, with selfish designs, contributed to that impression. The subject of transferring the Institution to the control of the Episcopalians of Kentucky was seriously considered. How far Episcopalians of Kentucky may have been answerable themselves for the state of feeling which existed, the writer has no means of knowing, but some of Dr. Cossitt's friends thought that they were not inactive. It was natural enough that they should have felt an interest in a measure that would have contributed greatly to their success and establishment in Lower Kentucky.

The result of this condition of things was a great effort on the part of Dr. Cossitt to arouse the Church once more to interest on behalf of the College. He and Rev. F. C. Usher, who was connected with him in the department of instruction, published a circular letter, in which earnest appeals were made to the ministers and members of the Church.

These efforts were continued to the meeting of the General Assembly, which occurred in May following, Its sessions were held at Elkton, Kentucky. When the Assembly met, it appeared that the Church had been fully awakened to the importance and danger of the crisis. A magnificent scheme was formed. If it had been carried into effective operation, it would have relieved the College from debt, and rendered it permanent, if not prosperous. It was proposed to raise one hundred thousand dollars for educational purposes. Fifty-five thousand dollars of that sum was to serve as a perpetual endowment of Cumberland College; thirty thousand was to be used in Pennsylvania, in the endowment of a college there; and the remaining fifteen thousand dollars was to constitute a sort of floating capital, to be used as circumstances might suggest. Several of the most popular young men in the Church were engaged as agents; the people were not illiberal in their subscriptions, and everything seemed to promise well. Dr. Cossitt confidently believed that the College would be endowed and that the most liberal provision would be made for the education of candidates for the ministry. This last was always a controlling thought with him, as it has been with all the earnest educators in our Church. This thought originated the impulse which led to the establishment of Cumberland College first and afterward to the establishment of Cumberland University.

At the General Assembly of 1841 things seemed to be going forward smoothly. The friends of the College were still hopeful, and even buoyant. It was announced at the General Assembly of 1842, that Cumberland College was still hopelessly in debt, that its property was under execution, and liable to be placed under the sheriff's hammer any day. The troubles of Cumberland College threw a shadow over Dr. Cossitt's path which continued to his dying day. The happiest hours of his life were those in which he was struggling—often against fearful odds—for prosperity, or to maintain the existence, of the Institution. It was the enterprise through which he expected his name to be handed down to posterity if it should reach posterity at all. He felt that his work in the College was the great work of his life.

When the condition of the College became known to the Assembly, the revulsion of feeling and the disappointment were so great that steps were immediately taken toward the removal of the Institution. A commission of gentlemen, all prominent members of the Church, was appointed to consider the matter, and take some action upon it. The commission met in Nashville, on the first day of the following July 1842, and determined to establish Cumberland College in Lebanon, Tennessee. Dr. Cossitt was elected to the presidency of the new College and accepted the appointment, and of course, the Commencement of the College at Princeton, in 1842, terminated his connection with that Institution. The friends of the old Institution, however, rallied, sold its useless property, paid its debts, and continued its operations with respectable success for a number of years.

Later life
In 1829 Mr. Cossitt made an excursion through some of the Middle and Southern States. He spent some time in Washington City, and while there published and circulated a pamphlet, setting forth the character and claims of the College. He preached in several of the churches of the city and received some donations. He preached also in Baltimore and Philadelphia, receiving very respectful attention in both cities. He brought one young man from Baltimore, and two or three from Eastern Virginia, to the Institution. Two of these young men remained until they graduated. They became useful and honored men.

Early in 1830, the leading men connected with the College commenced the publication of the Religious and Literary Intelligencer, at Princeton. It was the first periodical of the Church. Mr. Cossitt was identified with it for a few months and was a principal contributor to its columns. The Assembly of 1830, however, transferred the editorial control of the paper to Rev. David Lowry. It afterward became the Revivalist, and finally the Cumberland Presbyterian, in Nashville.

In 1833 Mr. Cossitt lost his wife and the mother of his children. On the 19th of January, 1834, he was married a second time, to Miss Matilda Edwards, of Elkton, Kentucky. In 1839 he received the Doctorate of Divinity from Middlebury College, and also from the Trustees of Cumberland College, with which he was then connected.

In March 1840, he commenced the publication of the Banner of Peace. It was at first a monthly periodical. He continued it a year under this form. In December 1841 the publication was renewed. It was changed, however, from a monthly to a small weekly.

Early in the year 1843 Dr. Cossitt moved to Lebanon and took charge of Cumberland College at that place. In a short time, the Institution became what is now Cumberland University. He continued in the presidency of the College till the fall of 1844, when he resigned, and was succeeded by Rev. T. C. Anderson. He now gave himself up to the management of his paper, enlarging, and otherwise improving it, as he was able. He continued the publication of the Banner of Peace to the close of 1849. His editorial valedictory is contained in the number of the 24th December 1849. The paper was transferred to Rev. W. D. Chadick and Mr. W. L. Berry. Mr. Chadick assumed control of the editorial department.

In 1853 Dr. Cossitt published his Life and Times of Finis Ewing.

In the same year, he was elected by the Trustees Professor of Systematic Theology at Cumberland University. This appointment he declined, on account of his age and increasing infirmities.

For the last decade of his life, he devoted himself to the management of his own domestic concerns. In addition to the wife of his youth, he had buried a daughter at Princeton. Two others, both young wives, and one of them a young mother, had been taken from him after he came to Lebanon. He had committed to the grave also in Lebanon, an only son, and a son-in-law. In the quietude of his own home, he found time and opportunity for rest, intellectual refreshment, meditation, and prayer.

A few weeks before his death he became unusually ill. On the morning of the third of February, 1863, between four and five o'clock, he died.

References

1790 births
1863 deaths
Cumberland University faculty
Cumberland Presbyterian Church ministers
Religious leaders from Tennessee
19th-century American clergy